The One is the first studio album by Chinese singer Jane Zhang, released on October 11, 2006 by Huayi Brothers.

Track listing 
 Body Language (4:15)
 This Damned Thing Called Love (4:57)
 Take It Like a Man (3:49)
 If We Keep Loving (4:02)
 Can't Take It Back (3:13)
 Private Matter (4:11)
 Thinking of You, at 0:01 (4:12)
 Blockhead (3:48)
 Girl of Your Dreams (3:54)
 Midnight, Goodnight (4:28)

References 

2006 debut albums
Jane Zhang albums